Sidereal, meaning "of the stars", may refer to:

 Sidereal time
 Sidereal day
 Sidereal month
 Sidereal year
 Sidereal period of an object orbiting a star
 Sidereal and tropical astrology